Wenten Rubuntja  (c. 1923 – 2005) was an Australian artist, Aboriginal rights activist, and historian.

Wenten was born at Bart's Creek, about 56 km north of Alice Springs. 
A meeting of representatives of Central Australian Aboriginal communities elected Charlie Perkins as the first Central Land Council chair and Wenten Rubuntja as his deputy in 1975.

He served as chairman of the Central Land Council in 1976-1980 and 1985-88, bringing both his humour and his deep local knowledge to bear on proceedings. He was instrumental in protecting numerous sacred sites in and around Alice Springs. And it was in part due to his efforts that, in 2000, the Federal Court of Australia made its groundbreaking ruling, recognising Arrernte native title over large areas of greater Alice Springs. (It was the first time that Aboriginals had been given title over municipal land.)
In all his negotiations Rubuntja displayed a remarkable ability to integrate indigenous and non-indigenous concepts and to achieve satisfactory resolutions. He believed that white and black law were not incompatible, but had both to be properly understood by all parties. It was a vision that he also brought to his time on the Council of Aboriginal Reconciliation in 1991 and 1995. He was made a member of the Order of Australia in 1995.

Paintings
Mr Rubuntja was also an acclaimed artist both in the desert "dot" style and in the westernised landscape style, inspired by watching his uncle and legendary watercolour artist Albert Namatjira at work.
His paintings can be seen in the National Gallery of Australia and the Robert Holmes a Court collection, as well as the Northern Territory Gallery and the Araluen Collection in Alice Springs.

Rubuntja was appointed a Member of the Order of Australia in 1995 for "service to Aboriginal people, particularly in Central Australia".

See also
 Rabuntja, Wenten and Green, Jenny, with contributions from Rowse, Tim. the town grew up dancing: the life and art of Wenten Rubuntja. 2002. jukurrpa books, an imprint of IAD Press, Alice Springs.''

References 

1920s births
2005 deaths
Australian Aboriginal artists
Australian contemporary painters
Australian activists
People from the Northern Territory
Members of the Order of Australia